Luigi Gillarduzzi or Alois Gillarduzzi (Cortina d'Ampezzo, 2 February 1822 - Vienna, 1856) was an Austrian-Italian painter.

Biography

After studying design in Innsbruck, he attended the Academy of Venice. In 1846 he moved to Vienna. There in 1853 he exhibited: a Holy Family and Angels, The Flood, and The Bells of St. Mark announce the election of the Doge Foscari. The Ferdinandeum Museum in Innsbruck has the latter painting and The Venetian fisherman. He painted a Deposition in Nazarene style for the parish church of Cortina d'Ampezzo.

References

1822 births
1856 deaths
People from Cortina d'Ampezzo
19th-century Italian painters
Italian male painters
19th-century Austrian painters
19th-century Italian male artists
Austrian male painters
19th-century Italian sculptors
Italian male sculptors